BMS-F is a chemical from the aminoalkylindole family invented by Bristol-Myers Squibb around 1999, that acts as a potent and selective agonist for the cannabinoid receptor CB2, with a Ki of 8 nM at CB2 and 500x selectivity over the related CB1 receptor. It has antiinflammatory effects and inhibits release of TNF-α.

See also 
 A-796,260
 APP-FUBINACA
 JWH-200
 MDMB-FUBINACA
 MN-25
 Pravadoline
 S-777,469
 WIN 55,212-2

References 

Aminoalkylindoles
Designer drugs